Zarrow shuffle is a sleight of hand technique that gives the appearance of being a normal riffle shuffle, but in fact leaves the cards in exactly the same order.  This is an example of a false shuffle. It was invented by magician Herb Zarrow c. 1940. The sleight begins as a normal riffle shuffle, but the performer uses the top card of the deck to conceal the shuffle being cancelled by way of unweaving the cards.

References

See also
Card sharp

Sleight of hand
Card tricks